is a Japanese synchronised swimmer who competed in the 2008 Summer Olympics. Following her retirement from competition, Aoki became a "tarento", making regular appearances on Japanese television, including during the 2016 Summer Olympics.

References

1985 births
Living people
Japanese synchronized swimmers
Olympic synchronized swimmers of Japan
Synchronized swimmers at the 2008 Summer Olympics
Asian Games medalists in artistic swimming
Artistic swimmers at the 2006 Asian Games
Asian Games silver medalists for Japan
Medalists at the 2006 Asian Games
21st-century Japanese women